was a Japanese freestyle wrestler who won a gold medal at the 1952 Summer Olympics. He was the first Japanese gold medalist after World War II, the only Japanese gold medalist at the 1952 Olympics, and one of two Japanese medalists in wrestling at the 1952 Olympics, the other being flyweight Yushu Kitano, who won silver in freestyle.

Ishii took wrestling because there was no judo club around. He died of kidney cancer, aged 53.

References

External links

 
 

1926 births
1980 deaths
Olympic wrestlers of Japan
Wrestlers at the 1952 Summer Olympics
Japanese male sport wrestlers
Olympic gold medalists for Japan
Olympic medalists in wrestling
Medalists at the 1952 Summer Olympics
20th-century Japanese people